LA-41 is a constituency of Azad Kashmir Legislative Assembly which is currently represented by Ghulam Mohiuddin Dewan of Pakistan Tehreek-e-Insaf. It covers the area of Lahore Division in Pakistan. Only refugees from Kashmir Valley settled in Pakistan are eligible to vote.

Election 2016

elections were held in this constituency on 21 July 2016.

Election 2021 
Further Information: Azad Kashmir election 2021

Ghulam Mohi-ud-Din Dewan of Pakistan Tehreek-e-Insaf won this seat by obtaining 2326 votes.

Azad Kashmir Legislative Assembly constituencies